San Mango Cilento is an Italian hamlet (frazione) of the municipality of Sessa Cilento in the province of Salerno, Campania region. As of 2009 its population was of 466.

Geography
The village is located on a hill at 561 amsl, below the Stella mountain, in the middle of Cilento, and is part of its National Park.

See also
Cilento and Vallo di Diano National Park

References

External links

 San Mango Cilento website

Frazioni of the Province of Salerno
Localities of Cilento